Sinraptor is a genus of metriacanthosaurid theropod dinosaur from the Late Jurassic. The name Sinraptor comes from the Latin prefix "Sino", meaning Chinese, and "raptor" meaning robber. The specific name dongi honours Dong Zhiming. Despite its name, Sinraptor is not related to dromaeosaurids (often nicknamed "raptors") like Velociraptor. Instead, it was a carnosaur distantly related to Allosaurus. Sinraptor and its close relatives were among the earliest members of the Jurassic carnosaurian radiation. Sinraptor still remains the best-known member of the family Metriacanthosauridae, with some older sources even using the name "Sinraptoridae" for the family.

Discovery
 
 
The holotype specimen of Sinraptor was uncovered from the Shishugou Formation during a joint Chinese/Canadian expedition to the northwestern Chinese desert in 1987, and described by Philip J. Currie and Zhao Xijin in 1993. S. dongi, the type species, was described by Currie and Zhao in 1993. A second species, originally named Yangchuanosaurus hepingensis by Gao in 1992, may actually represent a second species of Sinraptor. Whether or not this is the case, Sinraptor and Yangchuanosaurus were close relatives, and are classified together in the family Metriacanthosauridae.

The dentition of Sinraptor was very similar to that of Allosaurus and indicated that it likely would have preyed upon medium-sized dinosaurs such as stegosaurs by using its blade-like teeth to inflict massive, fatal wounds.

The skeleton of Sinraptor hepingensis (formerly referred to Yangchuanosaurus) is on display at the Zigong Dinosaur Museum in Zigong, China.

Pathology
Sinraptor dongi skull specimen IVPP 10600 exhibits "a variety of gently curving tooth drags or gouges, shallow, circular punctures and one fully penetrating lesion." One rib was broken and healed via telescoping of its capitular shaft.

References

External links 

 The original Chinese text of Gao (1992)'s description of Yangchuanosaurus hepingensis, with pictures.

Metriacanthosaurids
Oxfordian life
Late Jurassic dinosaurs of Asia
Jurassic China
Fossils of China
Paleontology in Xinjiang
Fossil taxa described in 1993
Taxa named by Philip J. Currie
Taxa named by Zhao Xijin